Roaring Years is a 1962 Italian comedy film directed by Luigi Zampa, set in the 1930s during the Fascist period of Benito Mussolini. It stars Nino Manfredi and Gino Cervi, and was inspired by the satirical comedy "The Government Inspector” by Nikolai Gogol.

It won Best Feature at the 1962 Locarno International Film Festival.

Plot summary

The film portrays the corrupt administration of an Apulia town during the Fascist Regime of 1937, after it has learned, in a roundabout way, of a pending anonymous visit of a government inspector from Rome. The inspector will determine if the administration adhered to the government's strict guidelines for economic and social planning.

The threat of the inspection creates terror in the administrators, who fear their misdeeds will be revealed. Most fearful are those guilty of enriching themselves from public funds, and other abuses. They resort to pathetic staged measures to make it appear that they remained "honest administrators" and "good fascists".

An unsuspecting insurer also coming from Rome, Omero Battifiori, arrives in town for his work and he is mistaken for the inspector. He is made the object of every honour and, of course, he is utterly deceived. Eventually, the real inspector arrives.

Location
The movie was shot entirely in Ostuni and Alberobello.

Cast
Nino Manfredi as  Omero Battifiori
Gino Cervi as  Salvatore Acquamano
Michèle Mercier as Elvira Acquamano
Gastone Moschin as Carmine Passante
Salvo Randone as the Anti-fascist doctor De Vincenzi
Angela Luce as Rosa De Bellis
Rosalia Maggio as Nunzia Acquamano
Linda Sini
Carla Calò
Annetta Esposito
Gino Brillante
Giuseppe Ianigro as Nicola De Bellis
Gaetano Morino
Enzo Petito
Mara Maiello
Ruggero Pignotti
Massimo Marchetti
Lino Crispo
Mario Passante
Nunzia Fumo
Totò Ponti
Giulio Marchetti
Livia Grazioli
Fanfulla
Alfredo Rizzo

External links

1962 films
Commedia all'italiana
1962 comedy films
Italian black-and-white films
Films set in 1937
1960s Italian-language films
Films set in Italy
Films directed by Luigi Zampa
Films set in Apulia
Films shot in Matera
Films about fascists
Films with screenplays by Ruggero Maccari
Films based on The Government Inspector
1960s Italian films